Satelio is a pay-tv service for German-language television in Southern Africa (especially Namibia as well in South Africa (unter the Deukom label)), other African countries (Nigeria (since October 1, 2015)) and the Middle East. Satelio is provided by Deutscher Televisionsklub Betriebs GmbH based in Ismaning, Germany.

Distribution
Satelio broadcast its offer via the Amos-5 satellite (from 2 December 2013 to early June 2014 via Intelsat 20). Due to the failure of Amos-5 on November 21, 2015, the move to the Astra 4A satellite at 5° east was announced on November 23, 2015 and completed on November 24, 2015.

In Namibia, the broadcast takes place via the general broadcasting license of Hitradio Namibia, in Nigeria via ACTV.

Channels

TV

Das Erste (available in Namibia and South Africa only)
ZDF (available in Namibia and South Africa only)
3sat (available in Namibia and South Africa only)
arte (available in Namibia and South Africa only)
DW-TV (DW Deutsch)
RTL Television
RTL II
Sat.1
ProSieben
VOX
n-tv
kabel eins
Puls 4
Heimatkanal
Romance TV
Nitro
Super RTL
ProSieben Maxx
sixx
Jukebox
auto motor und sport channel/N24 (time-sharing)
Fix und Foxi TV

The five English-language sport channels ST Sports Premium HD, ST World Football HD, ST Sports Arena, ST Sports Life and ST Sports Focus are offered in cooperation with the South African pay-tv company StarSat since September 1, 2016 and are subject to a surcharge. Among other things, Satelio offers the transmission of live coverage  of Bundesliga football matches with this sports package.

Radio

Bayern 1
Bayern 3
Klassik Radio
Hitradio Namibia
Antenne Bayern
Radio Paloma
Rock Antenne
harmony.fm
radio ffn
sunshine live

Encryption
Panaccess is used as conditional access system.

References

External links 

 

Television in Africa
Television in Namibia
German-Namibian culture
Direct broadcast satellite services
Mass media in Munich
2013 establishments in Germany